White Oak is an unincorporated community in Camden County, Georgia, United States.  The ZIP Code for White Oak is 31568.

History
A post office called White Oak was established in 1894. The community took its name from nearby White Oak Creek.

Notes

Populated coastal places in Georgia (U.S. state)
Unincorporated communities in Camden County, Georgia
Unincorporated communities in Georgia (U.S. state)